Mather House, formally named Flora Mather House, is a college building named for Flora Stone Mather at Case Western Reserve University in Cleveland, Ohio. It was built as a dormitory for the Flora Stone Mather College for Women of Western Reserve University, and currently houses classrooms and offices for the university's departments of art history, classics, history, and political science.

It was built during 1913–1915. It was designed by architect Abram Garfield and was built by contractor Roderick D. Grant. The building faces Euclid Avenue, sitting between the Church of the Covenant and Thwing Hall. It is within the Flora Stone Mather College Historic District, but is not counted among its contributing buildings.

It should not be confused with the Mather House that formerly stood nearby at 11100 Euclid Avenue, on the University Hospitals of Cleveland main campus. That building, originally a dormitory for nursing students and later occupied by clinics, was one of four structures demolished in 2007 for the construction of the Center for Emergency Medicine and a parking garage, part of the hospital system's Vision 2010 plan.

References

Further reading
 

School buildings completed in 1915
Case Western Reserve University
Buildings and structures in Cleveland
University and college dormitories in the United States
1915 establishments in Ohio